Together is the fourth studio album by English rock band Dave Dee, Dozy, Beaky, Mick & Tich.

Track listing 
 "Below the Belt" - 3:17
"Love Is a Drum" - 4:22
"First Time Loving" - 3:17
"Bora Bora" - 2:15
"Don Juan" - 3:05
"Snake in the Grass" - 3:08
"P. Teaser" - 2:49
"Run Colorado!" - 3:45
"Margaretha Lidman" - 2:17
"Mountains of the Moon" - 3:26

Personnel
Jim Sullivan - accompaniment on "Below the Belt", "Don Juan" and "Run Colorado!"
Technical
Roger Wake - recording engineer
Barry Saich - cover design

References

External links 
 

1969 albums
Dave Dee, Dozy, Beaky, Mick & Tich albums
Albums produced by Steve Rowland (record producer)
Fontana Records albums